Rock Star Ate My Hamster is a management strategy computer game developed by Codemasters in 1988 and originally released on their full-price Gold label for the Amstrad CPC, ZX Spectrum, Commodore 64, Amiga and Atari ST. The game was written by Colin Jones, later to become known as author/publisher Colin Bradshaw-Jones.

The name of the game was inspired by a 1986 Sun newspaper headline - 'Freddie Starr ate my hamster'.

Synopsis 
Desperate to get out of the circus theatrics business, Cecil Pitt and his sidekick, Clive, turn to the world of Rock music Management with the help of a £50,000 inheritance.

Objective 
To win the game, one must select a band, record an album and earn 4 gold discs within the space of a year. If the player fails to meet this target, goes bankrupt or has no musicians left, the game is over.

Gameplay 
The game is almost entirely menu-driven with options that allow the player to decide what the band does next.

The player's first task as manager is to pick musicians for the band (see below), and then decide whether they should buy them brand-new equipment, second-hand equipment or get some dodgy gear off the back of a lorry.  

Once in the main game, the options presented are as follows:
 Practice - Lock the band away for up to 5 days so they can practice. The music of the band is also presented, gradually increasing from atonal noise to actual music. (Songs are generated on the fly by the software.)
 Gig - Go on tour. This is the primary source of moneymaking in the game.
 Publicity - Organise a publicity stunt that can make the band more famous, but can also trigger events that kill a band member.
 Gifts - Buy the band some gifts to keep them sweet, otherwise they may make some rather costly ultimatums.
 Record - Once the band gets a recording contract, this option appears and allows them to record an album.
 Release - Once the album's recorded, this option releases it along with any singles.

Along the way, the player also has to decide:
 Whether or not to play a charity gig. Some of the charities that contact the band are real and others fake. The band could end up with negative publicity if they ignore a genuine charity or get duped by a bogus one.
 Whether or not to accept a sponsorship deal.
 To shoot a Music video and who will direct it, the location and the theme of this project. The player has the options to select from a range of choices, each with a cost value. Expensive directors and locations or less costly ones. As with the parodical nature of the game director names lampoon real-life directors. A selection choice of a high level (most expensive) director is named Steven Cheeseburger (Steven Spielberg). There are many others fitting with the theme of recognizable but legally distinct names.
 Which recording contract is best for the player's band.
 What to do if a little organisation in Korea is bootlegging his or her records. Players have to decide if they should do nothing, sue them, buy them out or "send in the boys".

Releasing an album or single makes them eligible for the charts. A Top 10 Singles & Albums charts (depending on what players have released) gets displayed on screen every Sunday. The other bands in the Top 10 are also parodies of other rock bands.

Musicians 
At the outset, the player can choose to hire up to four musicians to make up the band. The musicians are parodies of contemporary pop music stars. Their weekly wage depends on their abilities and their fame, ranging from £30,000 for "Bill Collins" down to just £50 for "Sidney Sparkle".

'80s Pop Stars

Legends

Rockers

Controversy
The game is heavy on parody on existing people and names, which wasn't well-received across the board: according to Jones, "an irate parent had taken objection to one of the jokes in the spoof newspaper included in the box and WHSmith pulled the game from their shelves".

Notes and references 
All the information above was taken from either the actual gameplay, the game manual and/or packaging.

External links
ScrewAttack.com's Humorous Retro Video Feature on Rockstar ate my Hamster 
Rockstar Ate My Hamster at SnakeBecomesTheKey

1988 video games
Amstrad CPC games
Amiga games
Atari ST games
Codemasters games
Commodore 64 games
Europe-exclusive video games
Music management games
Strategy video games
Video games scored by Allister Brimble
ZX Spectrum games
Parody video games
Single-player video games
Video games developed in the United Kingdom